Harold Arlen (born Hyman Arluck; February 15, 1905 – April 23, 1986) was an American composer of popular music, who composed over 500 songs, a number of which have become known worldwide. In addition to composing the songs for the 1939 film The Wizard of Oz (lyrics by Yip Harburg), including "Over the Rainbow", Arlen is a highly regarded contributor to the Great American Songbook. "Over the Rainbow" was voted the 20th century's No. 1 song by the RIAA and the NEA.

Life and career
Arlen was born in Buffalo, New York, the child of a Jewish cantor. His twin brother died the next day. He learned to play the piano as a youth, and formed a band as a young man. He achieved some local success as a pianist and singer before moving to New York City in his early twenties, where he worked as an accompanist in vaudeville and changed his name to Harold Arlen. Between 1926 and about 1934, Arlen appeared occasionally as a band vocalist on records by The Buffalodians, Red Nichols, Joe Venuti, Leo Reisman, and Eddie Duchin, usually singing his own compositions.

In 1929, Arlen composed his first well-known song: "Get Happy" (with lyrics by Ted Koehler). Throughout the early and mid-1930s, Arlen and Koehler wrote shows for the Cotton Club, a popular Harlem night club, as well as for Broadway musicals and Hollywood films. Arlen and Koehler's partnership resulted in a number of hit songs, including the familiar standards "Let's Fall in Love" and "Stormy Weather".  Arlen continued to perform as a pianist and vocalist with some success, most notably on records with Leo Reisman's society dance orchestra.

In the mid-1930s, Arlen married, and spent increasing time in California, writing for movie musicals. It was at this time that he began working with lyricist E. Y. "Yip" Harburg. In 1938, the team was hired by Metro-Goldwyn-Mayer to compose songs for The Wizard of Oz, the most famous of which is "Over the Rainbow", for which they won the Academy Award for Best Music, Original Song. They also wrote "Down with Love" (featured in the 1937 Broadway show Hooray for What!), "Lydia the Tattooed Lady", for Groucho Marx in At the Circus in 1939, and "Happiness is a Thing Called Joe", for Ethel Waters in the 1943 movie Cabin in the Sky.

Arlen was a longtime friend and onetime roommate of actor Ray Bolger, who starred in The Wizard of Oz.

In the 1940s, he teamed up with lyricist Johnny Mercer, and continued to write hit songs like "Blues in the Night", "Out of this World", "That Old Black Magic", "Ac-Cent-Tchu-Ate the Positive", "Any Place I Hang My Hat Is Home", "Come Rain or Come Shine" and "One for My Baby (and One More for the Road)".

Arlen composed two of the defining songs of Judy Garland's career: "Over the Rainbow" and "The Man That Got Away", the last written for the 1954 version of the film A Star Is Born. At her famous 1961 Carnegie Hall concert, after finishing a set of his songs, Garland acknowledged Arlen in the audience and invited him to receive an ovation.

Arlen recorded his debut album as a vocalist, Harold Sings Arlen (With Friend), in 1966. Barbra Streisand accompanied him on two songs.

Marriage and death
Arlen and Anya Taranda married on January 6, 1937, over the objection of their parents, because she was a Gentile and he was Jewish. In 1951, Anya was institutionalized for seven years and died from a brain tumor in 1970.
Arlen never remarried and died of cancer on April 23, 1986, at his Manhattan apartment at the age of eighty-one.  Arlen is buried next to his wife at the Ferncliff Cemetery in Hartsdale, New York.  After Arlen's death, Irving Berlin summed up his life at a tribute, saying: "He wasn't as well known as some of us, but he was a better songwriter than most of us and he will be missed by all of us."

Shortly before his death, Arlen adopted the 22 year old adult son of his brother Julius "Jerry" Arluck, so that his estate would have an heir in order to extend his copyright. Samuel Arlen runs the company that owns the rights to the Arlen catalog.

Timeline

1905 Arlen born in Buffalo, New York
1920 (age 15) He formed his first professional band, Hyman Arluck's Snappy Trio.
1921 (16) Against his parents' wishes he left home.
1923 (18) With his new band – The Southbound Shufflers, performed on the Crystal Beach lake boat "Canadiana" during the summer of 1923.
1924 (19) Performed at Lake Shore Manor during the summer of 1924.
1924 (19) Wrote his first song, collaborating with friend Hyman Cheiffetz to write "My Gal, My Pal". Copyrighting the song as "My Gal, Won't You Please Come Back to Me?" and listed lyrics by Cheiffetz and music by Harold Arluck.
1925 (20) Makes his way to New York City with the group, The Buffalodians, with Arlen playing piano.
1926 (21) Had first published song, collaborating with Dick George to compose "Minor Gaff (Blues Fantasy)" under the name Harold Arluck.
1928 (23) Hyman (or Chaim (Hebrew name meaning life)) Arluck renames himself Harold Arlen.
1929 (24) Landed a singing and acting role as Cokey Joe in the musical The Great Day.
1929 (24) Composed his first well known song – "Get Happy" – under the name Harold Arlen.
1929 (24) Signed a yearlong song writing contract with the George and Arthur Piantadosi firm.
1930–1934 (25–29) Wrote music for the Cotton Club.
1933 (28) At a party, along with partner Ted Koehler, wrote the major hit song "Stormy Weather"
1934 (29) Wrote "Ill Wind (You're Blowin' Me No Good)" with lyrics by Ted Koehler for their last show at the Cotton Club Parade, in 1934, which was sung by Adelaide Hall
1935 (30) Went back to California after being signed by Samuel Goldwyn to write songs for the film Strike Me Pink.
1937 (32) Composed the score for the Broadway musical Hooray for What!. Married 22-year-old Anya Taranda, a celebrated Powers Agency model and former Earl Carroll and Busby Berkeley showgirl, actress, and one of the Original "Breck Girls".
1938 (33) Hired by Metro-Goldwyn-Mayer to compose songs for The Wizard of Oz.
1938 (33) While driving along Sunset Boulevard in Hollywood and stopping in front of Schwab's Drug Store, he came up with the song "Over the Rainbow".
1941 (36) Wrote "Blues in the Night"
1942 (37) Along with Johnny Mercer, he wrote one of his most famous songs, "That Old Black Magic".
1943 (38) Wrote "My Shining Hour"
1944 (39) While driving with songwriter partner Johnny Mercer came up with the song "Accentuate the Positive".
1945 (40) In a single evening's work in October with Johnny Mercer, came up with the song "Come Rain or Come Shine".
1949 (44) Collaborated with Ralph Blane to write the score for My Blue Heaven.
1950 (45) Worked with old pal Johnny Mercer on the film The Petty Girl, out of which came the song "Fancy Free".
1951 (46) His wife Anya was institutionalized in a sanitarium for 7 years.
1952 (47) Teamed up with Dorothy Fields on the film The Farmer Takes a Wife.
1953 (48) Harold's father, Cantor Samuel Arluck, died.
1954 (49) The musical A Star is Born starring Judy Garland singing the now classic, Harold Arlen and Ira Gershwin collaboration, "The Man That Got Away".
1954 (49) Becomes dangerously ill with a bleeding ulcer and is hospitalized but recovers to work with Truman Capote on the musical House of Flowers.
1958 (53) His mother Celia Arluck dies and Harold does not touch music for over a year, mourning her loss.
1962 (56) Wrote the score for the animated musical Gay Purr-ee, lyrics by E.Y. Harburg.
1970 (65) Arlen's wife Anya Taranda dies from a brain tumor. Arlen begins to lose interest in life, withdrawing from friends and family and becoming more reclusive.
1974 (69) The theme song for the ABC sitcom Paper Moon is based on the song of that title, written by Arlen and E.Y. "Yip" Harburg in 1932. The series was based on a 1973 Peter Bogdanovich film of the same name, which used the same song.
1979 (74) Is inducted into the American Theater Hall of Fame.
1985 (80) Adopts Samuel ("Sammy"), son of his younger brother Jerry and Rita Arluck as his son and primary heir.
1986 (81) Harold Arlen dies in New York City and is interred next to his wife at Ferncliff Cemetery in Hartsdale, New York.

Works for Broadway
Earl Carroll's Vanities of 1930 (1930) – revue – contributing composer
You Said It (1931) – musical – composer
Earl Carroll's Vanities of 1932 (1932) – revue – co-composer and co-lyricist with Ted Koehler
Americana (1932) – revue – contributing composer
George White's Music Hall Varieties (1933) – revue – co-composer
Life Begins at 8:40 (1934) – revue – composer
The Show is On (1936) – revue – contributing composer
Hooray for What! (1937) – musical – composer
Bloomer Girl (1944) – musical – composer
St. Louis Woman (1946) – musical – composer
House of Flowers (1954) – musical – composer and co-lyricist
Mr. Imperium (1951) – movie musical – featured composer
Jamaica (1957) – musical – composer – Tony nomination for Best Musical
Saratoga (1959) – musical – composer

Major songs

 "A Sleepin' Bee" – lyrics by Harold Arlen and Truman Capote
 "Ac-Cent-Tchu-Ate the Positive" – lyrics by Johnny Mercer
 "Any Place I Hang My Hat Is Home" – lyrics by Johnny Mercer
 "As Long as I Live" – lyrics by Ted Koehler
 "Between the Devil and the Deep Blue Sea" – lyrics by Ted Koehler
 "Blues in the Night" – lyrics by Johnny Mercer
 "Come Rain or Come Shine" – lyrics by Johnny Mercer
 "Ding-Dong! The Witch Is Dead" – lyrics by E. Y. Harburg
 "Down with Love" – lyrics by E. Y. Harburg
 "For Every Man There's a Woman" – lyrics by Leo Robin
 "Get Happy" – lyrics by Ted Koehler
 "Happiness Is a Thing Called Joe" – lyrics by E. Y. Harburg
 "Hit the Road to Dreamland" – lyrics by Johnny Mercer
 "Hooray for Love" – lyrics by Leo Robin
 "I Could Go On Singing" – lyrics by E. Y. Harburg
 "If I Only Had a Brain" – lyrics by E. Y. Harburg
 "I Had Myself A True Love" – lyrics by Johnny Mercer
 "I Gotta Right to Sing the Blues" – lyrics by Ted Koehler
 "I Love a Parade" – lyrics by Ted Koehler
 "Ill Wind" – lyrics by Ted Koehler
 "I Never Has Seen Snow" – lyrics by Harold Arlen and Truman Capote
 "It Was Written in the Stars" – lyrics by Leo Robin
 "I've Got the World on a String" – lyrics by Ted Koehler
 "It's Only a Paper Moon" – lyrics by E. Y. Harburg, Billy Rose
 "I Wonder What Became of Me" – lyrics by Johnny Mercer
 "Last Night When We Were Young" – lyrics by E. Y. Harburg
 "Let's Fall in Love" – lyrics by Ted Koehler
 "Let's Take a Walk Around the Block" – lyrics by Ira Gershwin and E. Y. Harburg
 "Like a Straw in the Wind" – lyrics by Ted Koehler
 "Lydia the Tattooed Lady" – lyrics by E. Y. Harburg
 "My Shining Hour" – lyrics by Johnny Mercer
 "On the Swing Shift" – lyrics by Johnny Mercer
 "One for My Baby (and One More for the Road)" – lyrics by Johnny Mercer
 "Out of This World" – lyrics by Johnny Mercer
 "Over the Rainbow" – lyrics by E. Y. Harburg
 "Right As The Rain" – lyrics by E. Y. Harburg
 "Sing My Heart" – lyrics by Ted Koehler
 "So Long, Big Time!" – lyrics by Dory Langdon
 "Stormy Weather" – lyrics by Ted Koehler
 "That Old Black Magic" – lyrics by Johnny Mercer
 "The Man That Got Away" – lyrics by Ira Gershwin
 "This Time the Dream's on Me" – lyrics by Johnny Mercer
 "What's Good About Goodbye?" – lyrics by Leo Robin
 "When the Sun Comes Out" – lyrics by Ted Koehler

Films
2003 – Stormy Weather: The Music of Harold Arlen (directed by Larry Weinstein)

Biographies

References

External links

 NPR profile of Harold Arlen on Weekend Edition Saturday
 
 
 
 
Harold Sings Arlen (with Friend), 1966 Columbia Records album , singing his own songs, dueting with Barbra Streisand on two
 Harold Arlen recordings at the Discography of American Historical Recordings.

1905 births
1986 deaths
20th-century American composers
20th-century American Jews
American musical theatre composers
Best Original Song Academy Award-winning songwriters
Broadway composers and lyricists
Brunswick Records artists
Burials at Ferncliff Cemetery
Columbia Records artists
Deaths from cancer in New York (state)
Jewish American composers
Jewish American songwriters
Male musical theatre composers
Musicians from Buffalo, New York
Songwriters from New York (state)
Vaudeville performers
Victor Records artists